The 2000 Tanduay Rhum Masters season was the second season of the franchise (under a new owner) in the Philippine Basketball Association (PBA).

Draft picks

Transactions

Occurrences
Tanduay went on to sweep the Purefoods Tender Juicy Hotdogs, 3-0, in their best-of-five semifinal series of the All-Filipino Cup, but the Rhum Masters saw their victories in Games two and three forfeited when they let Fil-Sham Sonny Alvarado play, despite repeated warnings by the PBA because of Alvarado's fake citizenship papers and the ordered deportation by the Bureau of Immigration. The fiasco went to court after Tanduay secured a restraining order from the Makati court, postponing two playing dates. The Rhum Masters finally withdrew their legal challenge and accepted the penalties from the Commissioner's Office assessed on the ballclub. The Rhum Masters are now down 1-2 against Purefoods in their semifinal series and lost their chance for a finals berth following a 71-72 overtime loss to the Hotdogs in Game four.

Roster

Elimination round

Games won

References

Tanduay
Tanduay Rhum Masters seasons